ROC Post Speke is a nuclear monitoring post in Speke, Liverpool built during the Cold War. It was operational between 1959 and 1968. It has the distinction of being the only post of its type in Merseyside. As of 2012, plans to renovate the post were put under consideration as part of the RAF Speke museum project, with funds donated to Help for Heroes.

Details
 Speke ROC Bunker
 WAB: SJ48
 Type: W
 Call Area: G
 Cashota Ref: G2462
 Locator: IO83NI
 Map ref: SJ142138326
 L24 8RB

References

Military history of Merseyside
Proposed museums in the United Kingdom